Aspa is a genus of sea snails, marine gastropod mollusks in the family Bursidae, the frog shells.

Species
Species within the genus Aspa include:

 Aspa marginata (Gmelin, 1791)

The genus Aspa is known in the fossil record from the Miocene epoch, about 13.65 million years ago. These fossils have been found in the Quaternary of Namibia and Spain, in the Pliocene of Costa Rica, Greece and Spain and in the Miocene of Austria, Greece, Hungary and Italy.

References

Bursidae
Monotypic gastropod genera